The 1958 La Flèche Wallonne was the 22nd edition of La Flèche Wallonne cycle race and was held on 26 April 1958. The race started in Charleroi and finished in Liège. The race was won by Rik Van Steenbergen.

General classification

References

1958 in road cycling
1958
1958 in Belgian sport
1958 Challenge Desgrange-Colombo
April 1958 sports events in Europe